XHZS-FM is a radio station in Mazatlán, Sinaloa, Mexico. Broadcasting on 100.3 FM from a transmitter on Cerro El Caracol, XHZS is owned and operated by Luz Network as Stereo Uno with a pop format.

History
XHZS received its concession on August 25, 1987.

The station has had various formats, including Los 40 Principales and the Planeta format.

In May 2016, XHZS flipped from Radiorama to MegaRadio affiliation and consequently changed names from @FM to Switch, as the former is a Radiorama-specific brand. The station reversed the change in 2017.

In March 2020, Luz Network assumed ownership and operation of the station and began programming its Stereo Uno pop format. The Federal Telecommunications Institute. This gives Luz Network a presence in all three major Sinaloa cities, as it owns stations in Los Mochis and Navolato–Culiacán.

References

Radio stations in Sinaloa